Floris Schaap (born 3 April 1965) is a Dutch former footballer and manager.

Career statistics

Club

Notes

Managerial

References

1965 births
Living people
Dutch footballers
Dutch expatriate footballers
Association football defenders
VV Katwijk players
S.C. Olhanense players
Portimonense S.C. players
S.C.U. Torreense players
S.C. Farense players
S.C. Braga players
Primeira Liga players
Liga Portugal 2 players
Segunda Divisão players
Dutch expatriate sportspeople in the United Arab Emirates
Dutch expatriate sportspeople in China
Dutch expatriate sportspeople in Thailand
Dutch expatriate sportspeople in Iran
Expatriate football managers in the United Arab Emirates
Expatriate football managers in China
Expatriate football managers in Thailand
Expatriate football managers in Iran
Footballers from Katwijk
Dutch football managers